Jennifer Koh (born 1976) is an American violinist, born to Korean parents in Glen Ellyn, Illinois.

Life and career
Koh earned a B.A. in English Literature from Oberlin College, as well as a Performance Diploma from the attached Oberlin Conservatory.  She is also a graduate of the  Curtis Institute and was the top medalist in the 1994 Tchaikovsky Competition. That year she also won a scholarship from the Concert Artists Guild. She received an Avery Fisher Career Grant in 1995.

Koh has performed extensively with such orchestras as the Los Angeles Philharmonic, New York Philharmonic, Czech Philharmonic, BBC National Orchestra of Wales, Baltimore Symphony Orchestra, Saint Louis Symphony, and Cleveland Orchestra and is an advocate of music education for children.

She is lauded for her programs of Bach. She performed and recorded a series "Bach and Beyond" which has received high critical praise.  She frequently premieres and records contemporary music of composers like Kaija Saariaho, John Zorn, and Esa-Pekka Salonen.

In 2012, Koh was a featured performer in the revival of the Philip Glass/Robert Wilson opera Einstein on the Beach, portraying the role of Einstein. Koh is a faculty member at the Mannes School of Music.

Discography

Further reading

References

External links
 Jennifer Koh official website
 Interview with Jennifer Koh by Bruce Duffie, June 30, 2004
 Art of the States: Jennifer Koh performance of Mood (1918) by Carl Ruggles

1976 births
Living people
American classical violinists
People from Glen Ellyn, Illinois
Oberlin College alumni
Curtis Institute of Music alumni
American musicians of Korean descent
Cedille Records artists
Women classical violinists
20th-century classical violinists
20th-century American women musicians
21st-century classical violinists
21st-century American women musicians
Classical musicians from Illinois
Grammy Award winners
20th-century American violinists
21st-century American violinists